Morrow Township is an inactive township in Macon County, in the U.S. state of Missouri.

Morrow Township has the name of William Morrow, a pioneer settler.

References

Townships in Missouri
Townships in Macon County, Missouri